The Lions Gate Bridge, opened in 1938 and officially known as the First Narrows Bridge, is a suspension bridge that crosses the first narrows of Burrard Inlet and connects the City of Vancouver, British Columbia, to the North Shore municipalities of the District of North Vancouver, the City of North Vancouver, and West Vancouver. The term "Lions Gate" refers to the Lions, a pair of mountain peaks north of Vancouver. Northbound traffic on the bridge heads in their general direction. A pair of cast concrete lions, designed by sculptor Charles Marega, were placed on either side of the south approach to the bridge in January 1939.

Prospect Point in Stanley Park offered a good high south end to the bridge, but the low flat delta land to the north required construction of the extensive North Viaduct.

The bridge has three reversible lanes, the use of which is indicated by signals. The centre lane changes direction to accommodate for traffic patterns. The traffic volume on the bridge is 60,000–70,000 vehicles per day. Trucks exceeding  are prohibited, as are vehicles using studded tires. The bridge forms part of Highways 99 and 1A.

On March 24, 2005, the Lions Gate Bridge was designated a National Historic Site of Canada.

History

In 1890, land speculator George Grant Mackay wrote in the local paper that he foresaw a bridge over the first narrows. The First Narrows ferry operated between 1909 and 1947. The decision on whether to build the bridge was put to the electorate of Vancouver in 1927, but the first plebiscite was defeated and the idea was put to rest for the time being.

Alfred James Towle Taylor, an engineer with a land interest in the construction of the bridge, worked to overcome local opposition to its construction. Taylor was able to convince the Guinness family (of the Irish stout fame) to invest in the land on the north shore of Burrard Inlet. They purchased  of West Vancouver mountainside through a syndicate called British Pacific Properties Ltd.

On December 13, 1933, a second plebiscite was held, passing with 70 percent in favour. After considerable further negotiations with the federal government, approval was finally granted, with the requirement that Vancouver materials and workmen be used as much as possible to provide employment during the Great Depression. The 1933 bylaw authorizing construction included a provision mandating that "no Asiatic person shall be employed in or upon any part of the undertaking or other works".

The bridge was designed by the Montreal firm Monsarrat and Pratley, which was later responsible for the Angus L. Macdonald Bridge in Halifax, Nova Scotia, using a similar design. Other companies involved in the construction of the bridge included Swan Wooster Engineering, Parsons Brinckerhoff Quade & Douglas, Rowan Williams Davies & Irwin Inc., Canron Western Constructors, Dominion Bridge Company, American Bridge Company.

Construction began on March 31, 1937. On May 29, 1939, King George VI and Queen Elizabeth presided over the official opening during a royal visit to Canada. A toll of 25 cents was charged for each car or horse and carriage; five cents was charged for pedestrians or bicycles.

The bridge was built with two lanes, but a third reversible lane was added on May 19, 1952, to add capacity during peak periods in the peak direction. The system cost $18,000 and was initially controlled with signs to indicate when the reversible centre lane was opened to traffic. On January 20, 1955, the Guinness family sold the bridge to the province of British Columbia for $5,873,837the cost of the original construction. The government also considered plans to build a parallel span, which was estimated to cost $17 million in 1954, but these were shelved in favour of moving forward with the construction of the Second Narrows Bridge farther east up the Burrard Inlet and improving the existing Lions Gate Bridge.

A partial cloverleaf interchange was built in 1956 at Marine Way, located at the end of the bridge's north approach, and was followed by a new bridge over the Capilano River to address congestion issues. The toll instituted by the Guinness family remained on the Lions Gate Bridge until April 1, 1963, as part of the provincial government's toll removal scheme for several bridges. The toll plaza at the north end of the bridge was later demolished. In 1965, the centre lane controls were replaced with traffic signals.

In 1975, the deteriorating original concrete deck of the North Viaduct was replaced with a lighter, wider, and stronger steel orthotropic deck with wider lanes. This was carried out in sections using a series of short closures of the bridge; each time, one old section was lowered from the bridge and its replacement was put into place.

In 1986, the Guinness family, as a gift to Vancouver, purchased decorative lights that make it a distinctive nighttime landmark. The 170 lights were designed and installed by British engineer Ian Hayward, and first lit up on February 19 of that year. In July 2009, the bridge's lighting system was updated with new LED lights to replace its system of 100-watt mercury vapour bulbs. The switch to LEDs was expected to reduce power consumption on the bridge by 90 percent and save the provincial government about $30,000 a year in energy and maintenance costs.

From September 2000 to September 2001, the replacement of the entire suspended structure of the original suspension bridge was undertaken without interruption of peak-hour trafficthe first time an entire suspended structure of a major suspension bridge was replaced while in daily use. As with the 1975 replacement work, this was facilitated by a series of separate nighttime and weekend closures to replace one section at a time. The old suspended section was lowered to a barge, and the new lighter and wider orthotropic deck section raised into place and connected. A total of 47 sections were used before being paved. The new deck was designed with the two pedestrian walkways cantilevered to the outside of the suspension cables and the three road lanes widened from  each. As a result of the 2001 replacement, the 63-year-old suspension bridge, which was described as "not designed for durability", had its lifespan extended.

In popular culture
The bridge is often used in television broadcasts as a symbol of Vancouver; most telecasts of NHL hockey games played in Vancouver show the bridge at least once.
The bridge is the namesake of locally founded film company Lionsgate.
It was featured as a set for the opening falling bridge scene in the 2011 film Final Destination 5.
The bridge is featured in the background of the "Vancouver Velocity" course in Mario Kart Tour.

Gallery

See also
 1946 Vancouver Island earthquake
 List of bridges
 List of bridges in Canada
 Angus L. Macdonald Bridge, sister bridge

References

External links

 1938 film about the construction of the bridge
Building a Vancouver Icon: The Lions Gate Bridge – the construction of the Lions Gate Bridge (illustrated with many photographs)
 Bridges of Greater Vancouver
 

Bridges completed in 1938
Bridges in Greater Vancouver
Buildings and structures in Vancouver
Former toll bridges in Canada
Heritage sites in British Columbia
National Historic Sites in British Columbia
Road bridges in British Columbia
Roads with a reversible lane
Suspension bridges in Canada
Stanley Park
Tourism in Vancouver
Transport in West Vancouver